The 2006 South Tyneside Metropolitan Borough Council election took place on 4 May 2006 to elect members of South Tyneside Metropolitan Borough Council in Tyne and Wear, England. One third of the council was up for election and the Labour Party stayed in overall control of the council.

After the election, the composition of the council was:
Labour 34
Independent 7
Progressive 6
Liberal Democrat 4
Conservative 3

Campaign
Before the election Labour controlled the council with 36 seats, with 6 Progressives, 5 independents, 4 Liberal Democrats and 3 Conservatives taking the remaining seats. 18 seats were contested in the election with Labour having a full 18 candidates, independents 19, Conservatives 17, Liberal Democrats 12, Progressives 3, Greens and British National Party 2 each and 1 from the United Kingdom Independence Party. The big majority for Labour meant that there was little chance of them losing control of the council in the election.

The election saw early voting stations set up so that for the first time voters were able to vote in the normal way for up to 2 weeks before election day. However turnout on election day was significantly down at 35.9%, compared to 41.41% at the last election in 2004.

Election result
The results saw Labour hold on to control of the council with a slightly smaller majority after holding all but 2 of the seats they were defending. The 2 defeats for Labour came in Fellgate and Hedworth and Westoe wards where 2 independent candidates were successful.

Ward results

References

2006
2006 English local elections
21st century in Tyne and Wear